Sidney O'Linn (5 May 1927 – 11 December 2016) was a South African sportsman who played Test cricket in seven Tests for South Africa between 1960 and 1961 and professional football for South Africa.

Born Sidney Olinsky into a Jewish family, he was a left-hander who batted down the order. He was a member of the South African tour of England in 1960, the first to be confronted by anti-apartheid demonstrations, and scored 98 (his highest in Tests) in six hours at Trent Bridge before being caught in the slips by Colin Cowdrey.

O'Linn was also a footballer, having played for South Africa against Australia in 1947, and later making 187 appearances for Charlton Athletic in the English First Division. While playing football in England, he played cricket for Kent County Cricket Club, where he was the deputy wicket-keeper from 1951 to 1954. He died in Randburg on 11 December 2016.

References

External links

1927 births
2016 deaths
People from Oudtshoorn
South Africa Test cricketers
South African cricketers
Gauteng cricketers
Kent cricketers
Western Province cricketers
South African soccer players
South Africa international soccer players
South African people of Polish-Jewish descent
Jewish cricketers
Jewish South African sportspeople
Association football inside forwards
Charlton Athletic F.C. players
English Football League players
South African expatriate soccer players
Expatriate footballers in England
Cricketers from the Western Cape